is a Japanese four-panel manga series by Cherry Arai, serialized in Houbunsha's Manga Time Kirara magazine since February 2003 and fourteen tankōbon volumes have been collected so far. An anime adaptation by Doga Kobo aired from April to June 2016.

Plot
The story revolves around the everyday life of three high-school girls who all have a kanji "葉" (literally "leaf") in their names, and have different features - hence the translation of the title, "three leaves, three colors".

Characters

"Three leaves"

A girl in the same grade but different class to Futaba and Teru. She was raised in a rich family, but before the story starts, her mother died and her father's enterprise went bankrupt; as a result, she has to lead a frugal and ordinary life on her own, while she still speaks and behaves with the demeanor of a noble girl, and still longs for her previous rich life but gradually adapts. She was very lonely since that misfortune, until Futaba and Teru run across her at the start of the story, and befriend her. Her given name means "leaf child".

A cheerful and energetic girl featuring an extraordinary large appetite. She always wins the food challenges held by restaurants, so that many restaurants place her on blacklists; and actually she did this just for being adequately fed instead of getting the awards. She is not good at studying, but does well in cooking. Her given name literally means "double leaves".

The class representative of Futaba's class. She has a haraguroi personality, which means she acts nicely to other people while she is actually mean to them; Serina and Asako are always her victims. She is excellent in study, but does very poor in sports. She can't resist cute little animals. Her surname literally means "leaf" + "mountain". She has a cat named Beelzebub, which her sister claims that it was because the cat is surrounded by flies when they found it.

Other characters

Classmate of Futaba and Teru, and friend of Asako. She is exceeded by Teru in many aspects, such as the grading in study, and the competition for the position of class representative, thus she sees Teru as her main rival; but she always becomes a victim of Teru's haraguroi personality in their confrontations. She loves cute little animals, like Teru. Her cat is named Eternal because she wishes it to live a long life, as her previous cat has died.

Classmate of Futaba and Teru, and friend of Serina. She is air-headed and always hurts other people unintentionally. Typically, she often tries to help Serina when the latter confronts Teru, but her efforts always hurts her friend instead.

Former maid of Nishikawa family. After the bankrupt of Nishikawa's enterprise, she lost that job and starts a pâtisserie. She accepts Yōko as a part-timer to support Yōko's living. She is actually over 30 years old, but has the appearance of a teenager girl. She has the tendency to sneak into Yōko's wearing a high school girl uniform, to her dismay.

Former manservant of Nishikawa family. After the bankrupt of Nishikawa's enterprise, he lost that job and has to make a living with multiple part-time jobs; nevertheless, he still tries his best to take care of Yōko.

Teru's elder sister. In contrast to Teru, she features an angelic personality, although her innocent mind occasionally brings about unintentional hurts. She always makes foods that she claims to be good for health, but with terrible taste and smell.

The son of the rich Takezono family which had dealings with Nishikawa family. He regards Yōko as his fiancée even after Nishikawa's misfortune, and despite he is only a boy of ten years old or so.

Futaba's little cousin. Being a girl of only 11 years old, she has a life plan to her fifties involving becoming an idol and later a noblewoman. She is the classmate of Yū, and lists him as "the first backup of boyfriend", and behaves intimately with him when they meet, much to his annoyance. Despite thinking of becoming an idol, her singing is terrible.

A high-school boy with the appearance of a middle-school student. He often participates in food challenges, like Futaba, but always loses to her, and thus hates her. Despite his appearance, he is one year older than Sasame, and quite popular in school as a mascot due to his cuteness.

Hajime's younger sister, and Yōko's classmate. She looks quite like her brother so that the "Three Leaves" once mistook they are twins. She tries to stop Futaba from participating the food challenges to avoid Hajime being annoyed, and fails; on the other hand, she admires Yōko and wants to befriend her. When she learns Futaba and Yōko are friends, she gets into a dilemma. She is Yōko's first friend among her classmates.

Media

Manga
Sansha San'yō began as a Japanese manga series by Cherry Arai and was first published in Manga Time Kirara 's February 2003 issue. The manga was serialized at Manga Time Kirara, except between December 2003 to January 2007 when the manga was serialized at Manga Time Kirara Carat. The manga's chapters were compiled into fourteen tankōbon volumes.

Anime
A 12-episode anime television adaptation by Doga Kobo aired from April 11 to June 27, 2016 It is directed by Yasuhiro Kimura and written by Hidoaki Koyasu. Jun Yamazaki provided the series' character designs. Later it was confirmed that Crunchyroll was added the series alongside Time Travel Girl and Omamori Himari on their catalog since December 21, 2016.

In episode 12, the song  is used as an insert song, which is also performed by Triple♣Feeling.

Episode list

Video game
Characters from the series appear alongside other Manga Time Kirara characters in the 2019 mobile RPG, Kirara Fantasia.

Notes

References

External links
 Anime official website 
 

Comedy anime and manga
Doga Kobo
Funimation
Houbunsha manga
Seinen manga
Toho Animation
Yonkoma